The Tree is a 2001 Singaporean supernatural-mystery drama film directed by Daisy Chan, starring Zoe Tay, Francis Ng, Phyllis Quek, Tse Kwan Ho and Deng Mao Hui. Produced by Mediacorp Raintree Pictures, the film was shot entirely in Singapore over 28 days with a production budget of S$1.1 million. It was released in Singapore cinemas on 26 April 2001.

Plot
Lin Zixiong (Zheng Geping) dies after being hit by a car, and the only witness seems to be his stepson "Popiah" (Deng Mao Hui), a quiet young boy with no friends besides a gigantic tree. Police investigator Jiang Liangxing (Phyllis Quek) becomes convinced the driver was Lin's wife Guo Meifeng (Zoe Tay), whose first husband Xie Wenguang (Tse Kwan-ho) disappeared 5 years ago. Meanwhile, Jiang's boyfriend and pathologist Wu Chongzhe (Francis Ng) discovers a mysterious fungus in Lin's heart. He also befriends Popiah and learns that Lin had sexually abused him. Perhaps the answer to everything lies in the gigantic tree...

Cast
Deng Maohui as Xie Qingyu, a child nicknamed "Popiah"
Zoe Tay as Guo Meifeng, Popiah's mother
Francis Ng as Wu Chongzhe, a forensic pathologist
Phyllis Quek as Jiang Liangxing, Wu Chongzhe's girlfriend and a police superintendent
Lau Siu-ming as Wu Mingwei, Wu Chongzhe's father
Tse Kwan-ho as Xie Wenguang, Popiah's father
Zheng Geping as Lin Zixiong, Popiah's stepfather
Dasmond Koh as Chen Guoqiang, a police officer

Reception
Soh Yun-Huei gave the film 1/2 out of 4 stars, writing the film meant to blend "suspense, melodrama and romance together, but the end results are lumpy and unsatisfying".

References

External links

Films about trees
Films set in Singapore
Films shot in Singapore
Singaporean drama films
Singaporean speculative fiction films